Russia participated in the Junior Eurovision Song Contest 2020 which took place on 29 November 2020, in Warsaw, Poland. The Russian broadcaster All-Russia State Television and Radio Broadcasting Company (VGTRK) was responsible for organising their entry for the contest. Sofia Feskova won the national final on 25 September 2020 with the song "". The representative of Russia in 2020, Sofia Feskova, placed 10th place with 88 points.

Background 

In the  contest, Russia was represented by the song "A Time for Us" performed by Tatyana Mezhentseva and Denberel Oorzhak. The song placed 13th in a field of 19 countries with 72 points.

Before Junior Eurovision

Akademiya Eurovision 2020 
The Russian broadcaster, VGTRK, announced on 2 April 2020 that they would be participating in the 2020 contest. Submissions for entrants were open between 6 April to 25 August, with the audition stage taking place in the Russian capital, Moscow, in September 2020. VGTRK announced on 15 September that a total of eleven artists would be competing in the national final. The national selection of the entrant for Russia took place on 25 September 2020, and was televised a day later on 26 September. The winner was determined by a voting split of 50% jury members and 50% internet voting which opened on 16 September and closed on 24 September. Sofia Feskova won the national final with the song "".

Artist and song information

Sofia Feskova 
Sofia Feskova (born 5 September 2009) is a 12 year old Russian singer from St. Petersburg. She represented Russia at the Junior Eurovision Song Contest 2020 with the song "".

Moy novy den (My New Day) 
"" is a song by Russian singer Sofia Feskova. It represented Russia at the Junior Eurovision Song Contest 2020.

At Junior Eurovision
After the opening ceremony, which took place on 23 November, it was announced that Russia will perform ninth during the final, following Malta and preceding Spain. The contest was broadcast live from Warsaw, Poland, on 29 November 2020.

Performance

Feskova's performance featured augmented reality, with "bright pictures from magical dreams" on the LED screen.

Voting

Detailed voting results

References 

2020
Russia
Junior Eurovision Song Contest